The Global Cement and Concrete Association is an international industry association that was established in 2018. as of 2018, it represented about 35% of the global industry for Cement and Concrete. The association was formed, in part, because the industry wanted to participate in sustainable development conversations, participating in COP24 and COP25. The Organization published guidelines for sustainable cement in 2018.

Members 
As of July 2020, GCCA reported 40 members including:

 Asia Cement
 Breedon
 Buzzi Unicem
 Cementir Holding N.V.
 Cementos Argos
 Cementos Molins
 Cementos Pacasmayo
 Cementos Progreso S.A.
 CEMEX
 Ciments De L’Atlas (CIMAT)
 Çimsa Çimento
 CNBM
 Corporacion Moctezuma S.A.B. DE C.V.
 CRH
 Dalmia Cement
 Dangote
 Eurocement
 Grupo Cementos de Chihuahua SAB de CV (GCC)
 HeidelbergCement
 JSW Cement
 LafargeHolcim
 Medcem Madencilik
 Nesher Israel Cement Enterprises Ltd
 Orient Cement Ltd
 SCG Cement
 Schwenk Zement KG
 SECIL
 Shree Cement Ltd
 Siam City Cement Ltd
 Taiheiyo Cement
 Taiwan Cement Corporation
 Titan Cement
 Ultratech
 Unión Andina de Cementos S.A.A (UNACEM)
 Vassiliko Cement Works Public Company Ltd
 Vicat
 Votorantim
 West China Cement
 YTL Cement

References 

Trade associations
Cement industry